Brian Mondschein, Jr. (born 9 January 1983) is an American-born Israeli pole vaulter.

A paternal grandson of decathlete Irving Mondschein, and son of Brian Mondschein who won a gold medal in the decathlon, he changed eligibility in 2010 from the United States to Israel.

In the same year, he competed at the 2010 European Championships without reaching the final. His personal best jumps are 5.63 metres (indoor), achieved in May 2009 in Jonesboro, AR, and 5.60 metes (outdoor), achieved in July 2009 in Champaign, IL.

References

1983 births
Living people
Jewish American sportspeople
Place of birth missing (living people)
Israeli male pole vaulters
21st-century American Jews